Sekimoto (written: 関本) is a Japanese surname. Notable people with the surname include:

, Japanese wrestler
, Japanese film director and screenwriter
, Japanese baseball player
, Japanese footballer
, Japanese engineer

Japanese-language surnames